Cor Bakker (2 October 1918 – 18 December 2011) was a Dutch racing cyclist. He rode in the 1948 Tour de France.

References

External links
 

1918 births
2011 deaths
Dutch male cyclists
Sportspeople from Zaanstad
Cyclists from North Holland
20th-century Dutch people